Hans Olav Felix (born 25 July 1951) is a Norwegian trade unionist.

A certified electrical fitter, he worked in his field from 1972 to 1987 before becoming a full-time trade unionist. In 2001 he took over as leader of EL & IT Forbundet.

References

1951 births
Living people
Norwegian trade unionists
Place of birth missing (living people)
20th-century Norwegian people